Blessed Udoh (born ) is a Nigerian female weightlifter, competing in the 48 kg category and representing Nigeria at international competitions.

She participated at the 2004 Summer Olympics in the 48 kg event. She competed at world championships, most recently at the 2001 World Weightlifting Championships.

Udoh won 3 medals in the women's 48 kg category at the 2007 All-Africa Games, but tested positive after the competition.

Major results

References

External links
 
http://news.bbc.co.uk/sport2/hi/olympics_2004/weightlifting/results/3532064.stm
http://gwenweightlifting.blogspot.com/2016/10/gwenternational-dimplomacy-story-on.html
http://ww.todor66.com/olim/2004/Weightlifting/Women_under_48kg.html
http://www.gettyimages.com/photos/blessed-udoh?excludenudity=true&sort=mostpopular&mediatype=photography&phrase=blessed%20udoh&family=editorial

1984 births
Living people
Nigerian female weightlifters
Weightlifters at the 2004 Summer Olympics
Olympic weightlifters of Nigeria
Place of birth missing (living people)
World Weightlifting Championships medalists
Doping cases in weightlifting
Nigerian sportspeople in doping cases
Competitors at the 2007 All-Africa Games
African Games competitors for Nigeria
20th-century Nigerian women
21st-century Nigerian women